Garçon, the French word for "boy", may refer to:

People
Émile Garçon (1851–1922), French jurist. 
Maurice Garçon (1889–1967), French novelist, historian, essayist, and lawyer
Pierre Garçon (born 1986), American football player
 A waiter in a French restaurant

Films and music
Garçon!, a 1983 film by the French author and director Claude Sautet
"Garçon" (song), a 2007 single by French artist Koxie
Le Garçon (EP), a 2014 release by Solomon
Marie et les Garçons, French punk rock band, later known as the Garçons, active 1976–1980

See also

Garson (disambiguation)
Garzon (disambiguation)